James Shaw (born March 5, 1994) is an American volleyball player. Shaw currently plays for WWK Volleys Herrsching. He is part of the United States men's national volleyball team. On club level he played for Stanford University.
Shaw started his professional career in the 2016/2017 season where he played for Italian Club, Pallavolo Padova. In May 2017, it was announced that he would spend the upcoming 2017/2018 season at Sir Safety Perugia. He spent his 2022 summer training with team USA and traveled to Brazil for the first round of VNL.

Personal life
James Shaw was born in Stanford, California and grew up in Woodside, California. He attended St. Francis High School. He later attended Stanford University, where he graduated from in 2016 with a major in science, technology, and society. His parents are Don and Carolyn Shaw. His father acted as head coach of men's and women's volleyball at Stanford for 27 years. He has one older sister named Jordan who also played volleyball at St. Mary's College.

References

External links
 profile at FIVB.org

1994 births
Living people
American men's volleyball players
Place of birth missing (living people)
ZAKSA Kędzierzyn-Koźle players
People from Woodside, California
Stanford Cardinal men's volleyball players